Tongues of Angels may refer to:
 Tongues of angels in 1 Corinthians 13:1
 Angelic tongues in Second Temple Judaism
 Enochian language of Dr. John Dee and Sir Edward Kelley
 Speaking in tongues of Charismatic Christianity, sometimes interpreted as the speech of angels transmitted through humans

See also
 Angelic language (disambiguation)
 Language of angels (disambiguation)